SS Pierce Butler was a Liberty ship built in the United States during World War II. She was named after Pierce Butler, a South Carolina, rice planter, slaveholder, politician, an officer in the American Revolutionary War, and one of the Founding Fathers of the United States. He served as a state legislator, a member of the Congress of the Confederation, a delegate to the 1787 Constitutional Convention, and a member of the United States Senate.

Construction
Pierce Butler was laid down on 27 June 1942, under a Maritime Commission (MARCOM) contract, MCE hull 306, by the Bethlehem-Fairfield Shipyard, Baltimore, Maryland; she was sponsored by Mrs. P.D. Daly, the wife of a yard employee, and was launched on 18 August 1942.

History
She was allocated to Calmar Steamship Corp., on 27 August 1942.

Sinking
Both torpedoes struck Pierce Butler on the starboard side, one struck hold #5, while the other struck forward of the engine room. The crew sent out a distress signal, which was answered, and returned fire at U-177. Eight rounds were fired from the bow mounted /50 caliber gun and  seven rounds from the stern mounted /50 caliber gun in an effort to keep U-177 submerged. It took ten minutes to secure the engines so that the crew of eight officers, 33 crewmen, and 21 Armed guards could abandon the ship in the four lifeboats. Pierce Butler sank at the stern at 12:10. The crew of U-177 questioned Pierce Butlers third mate and offered to send out a distress signal. The entire crew of 62 were rescued after about 20 hours when  picked them up and landed them at Durban, South Africa.

References

Bibliography

 
 
 
 
 

 

Liberty ships
Ships built in Baltimore
1942 ships
Ships sunk by German submarines in World War II
Ships named for Founding Fathers of the United States